Fort Miller (originally Fort Darby or Darby's Fort) was a coastal defense fort in Marblehead, Massachusetts, in existence circa 1630–1900. Circa 1861 it was renamed for James Miller, a colonel in the War of 1812, distinguished for his actions in the Battle of Lundy's Lane. He was later Collector of the Port in nearby Salem from 1824 to 1849.

History
The fort was Marblehead's first coastal fort, originally built circa 1629-1632 by colonial forces under the direction of acting Governor of Massachusetts John Endecott. It was initially named Fort Darby or Darby's Fort, allegedly after a similar head of land at Derby, Dorsetshire, England. The location was on Naugus Head at the northwest corner of Marblehead's peninsula.  The fort was actually sited to defend the harbor of Salem, joined by Fort Pickering on Winter Island in 1643. The Gale's Head Fort (later Fort Sewall) was built in 1634 as Marblehead's main defense. 

Fort Darby was used in the American Revolutionary War. It was subsequently repaired for the War of 1812 as a lookout post and drill area for nearby Fort Sewall. It was rebuilt as a five-gun battery and renamed Fort Miller for the Civil War. The fort had five guns, with a magazine and bomb-proof shelter on the parade, and a barracks outside the fort. An armament report by Major Charles E. Blunt dated January 31, 1865 shows the fort had two 8-inch smoothbore guns, two 24-pounder smoothbore guns, and one 32-pounder rifle. Fort Miller was garrisoned by the 11th Unattached Company of Massachusetts militia from December 1864 to June 1865. The fort served through the Spanish–American War, after which it was probably demolished.

See also
 Fort Glover
 Seacoast defense in the United States
 List of coastal fortifications of the United States
 List of military installations in Massachusetts

References

 
 
 

Miller
Miller
Miller
Miller
Buildings and structures in Marblehead, Massachusetts
Miller
Miller